Yelena Vladimirovna Melnikova-Tchepikova; born 17 June 1971) is a Russian former biathlete who competed in the 1992 Winter Olympics.

References

1971 births
Living people
People from Sverdlovsk Oblast
Russian female biathletes
Olympic biathletes of the Unified Team
Biathletes at the 1992 Winter Olympics
Olympic bronze medalists for the Unified Team
Olympic medalists in biathlon
Medalists at the 1992 Winter Olympics
Sportspeople from Sverdlovsk Oblast
20th-century Russian women
21st-century Russian women